"Sam" Lok Chi Kit (born 3 January 1967) is a Hong Kong racing driver currently competing in the TCR Asia Series. Having previously competed in the Lamborghini Super Trofeo Asia, Ferrari Challenge Asia Pacific and Audi R8 LMS Cup amongst others.

Racing career
Lok began his career in 2013 in the Lamborghini Super Trofeo Asia series. He also raced in the series in 2015, finishing 4th in the Am class standings. He raced in the Volkswagen Scirocco R-Cup China and Ferrari Challenge Asia Pacific in 2014. In 2015 he raced in the Audi R8 LMS Cup, finishing 8th in the Am class standings.

In November 2015 it was announced that he would race in the TCR Asia Series & TCR International Series, driving a SEAT León Cup Racer for Asia Racing Team. However, he failed to qualify for the event and therefore didn't take part in any of the two races.

Racing record

Complete TCR International Series results
(key) (Races in bold indicate pole position) (Races in italics indicate fastest lap)

References

External links
 

1967 births
Living people
TCR Asia Series drivers
TCR International Series drivers
Hong Kong racing drivers
Asia Racing Team drivers
Eurasia Motorsport drivers
Formula Masters China drivers
20th-century Hong Kong people
21st-century Hong Kong people